Vidya Murthy is an Indian Kannada film and television actress well known for her roles in television serials such as Mayamruga, Baduku, Muktha Muktha and Krishna Tulasi and recently has appeared in Papa Pandu and Magalu Janaki serials being aired on Colors Super Channel. She has over 35 serials and more than a dozen films to her credit. She is a talented artist from the T. N. Seetharam team.

Career 
Vidya Murthy started acting in plays in school and college. She was in the first batch of NMKRV College, selected by its principal, C. N. Mangala, because of her acting skills. Her family did not approve of her choice of career and nor did her parents-in-law after her marriage. She made her film debut in Urvashi, written by Gorur Ramaswamy Iyengar.

Personal life 
Murthy was born in the Hill Station town of Madikeri in Kodagu district as her father was working there. Her father's native place is Mavinakere in Hassan district.  She is married to Heragu Narasimha Murthy and has a son. G. K. Jagdish, her brother, is her inspiration and was a renowned bharathanatyam dancer and actor.  A Kannada literature, economics and psychology student, she was a part of a writers' group, and used to write poems and short stories.

Television career

Filmography

See also
List of people from Karnataka
Kannada cinema
List of Indian film actresses
Cinema of India

References

External links

Actresses in Kannada cinema
Living people
Kannada people
Actresses from Karnataka
Actresses from Bangalore
Indian film actresses
20th-century Indian actresses
21st-century Indian actresses
Actresses in Kannada television
Actresses in Kannada theatre
1956 births